A cnidariologist is a zoologist specializing in Cnidaria, a group of freshwater and marine aquatic animals that include the sea anemones, corals, and jellyfish.

Examples
 Edward Thomas Browne (1866-1937) 
 Henry Bryant Bigelow (1879-1967)
 Randolph Kirkpatrick (1863–1950)
 Kamakichi Kishinouye (1867-1929)
 Paul Lassenius Kramp (1887-1975)
 Alfred G. Mayer (1868-1922)

See also

References

External links

 01
Cnidarian biology
Marine zoologists
Zoologists by field of research